Stefan-Peter Greiner (born 1966 in Stuttgart) is a German luthier, who builds violins.

Career
Greiner built his first violin when he was 14 years old and completed his training in Bonn. His goal was to build instruments whose sounds come close to a singing voice, so focusing on the range from 2000 to 4000 Hz.

During a longstanding partnership with the Remagen physicist Heinrich Dünnwald, who has acoustically analysed over 1300 violins, Greiner has succeeded in coming close to the sound of revered, centuries old Guarneri and Stradivari. He received the 2003 Rheingau Musikpreis and customers include Leonidas Kavakos, Kim Kashkashian, Bruno Monsaingeon,  Frédéric Pelassy, Christian Tetzlaff, the Keller Quartet and members of the Hagen Quartet and the Alban Berg Quartet.
Currently, over 100 CDs featuring his instruments have been released.
Greiner currently resides in Zurich, Switzerland.

Publications 
 Stefan-Peter Greiner and Florian Leonhard: Jean-Baptiste Vuillaume, Bocholt 1998; 
 Brigitte Brandmair and Stefan-Peter Greiner: Stradivari Varnish - Scientific Analysis of his Finishing Technique on Selected Instruments, 2009

References

External links
 greinergeigen.de
 stradivarivarnish.com

1966 births
Living people
German luthiers
People from Stuttgart